The 1982 Tulsa Golden Hurricane football team represented the University of Tulsa during the 1982 NCAA Division I-A football season. In their sixth year under head coach John Cooper, the Golden Hurricane compiled a 10–1 record (6–0 against conference opponents) and won the Missouri Valley Conference (MVC) championship. The team defeated Big Eight Conference opponents Oklahoma State (25–15) and Kansas (20–15), but lost to Southwest Conference opponent Arkansas (38–0).

The team had two running backs who each rushed for over 1,000 yards during the 1982 season. Mike Gunter totaled 1,464 rushing yards, 11 touchdowns, and 7.5 yards per carry, while Ken Lacy rushed for 1,097 yards and 12 touchdowns with an average of 5.5 yards per carry. Quarterback Skip Ast accumulated 595 passing yards and 367 rushing yards. Head coach John Cooper was later inducted into the College Football Hall of Fame.

Schedule

References

Tulsa
Tulsa Golden Hurricane football seasons
Missouri Valley Conference football champion seasons
Tulsa Golden Hurricane football